Isis Central is a locality in the Bundaberg Region, Queensland, Australia.

History 
The locality takes its name from the Isis River, which in turn was named by mine owner William Howard who lived in the area from 1862. Howard named it after the Isis River in England, a tributary of the River Thames.

In 1894 local sugarcane growers decided to raise funds to build the Isis Central Sugar Mill. The Queensland Government approved the construction of the mill, costing £26,000 and Walkers Limited were engaged to build the mill. The first crushing began on Tuesday 7 September 1897.

Isis Central Mill Provisional School opened on 23 January 1899. It became Isis Central Mill State School on 1 January 1909. It closed on 11 December 1987.

Heritage listings 
There are a number of heritage-listed sites in Isis Central, including:

 721 Adies Road: Adie's House and Site

Education 
There are no schools in Isis Central. The nearest primary schools are in neighbouring Cordalba and Booyal. The nearest secondary school is in Childers.

References 

Bundaberg Region
Localities in Queensland